Elephas hysudrindicus, commonly known as Gajah Blora (Blora Elephant) in Indonesia is a species of extinct elephant of the Pleistocene of Java and is anatomically distinct from the extant Asian elephant (E. maximus).

The head of the Bandung Geological Museum, Yunus Kusumbrata said that this species existed around 15,000 years ago.

History of discovery 

This species was excavated in village of Sunggun, Mendalem, Kradenan, Blora in March 2009, found in almost complete condition (90%) under the dirt in former sand quarry in the village. The actual fossils were brought to Bandung Geological Museum and displayed at the museum.

References

Prehistoric elephants
Pleistocene proboscideans
Pleistocene mammals of Asia
Fauna of Java
Fossil taxa described in 1908